Yu Yangyi (born 8 June 1994) is a Chinese chess grandmaster. He qualified for the Grandmaster title at 14 years, 11 months and 23 days old in 2009.
In December 2014, he won the first Qatar Masters Open tournament, beating among others Vladimir Kramnik and Anish Giri.

He was a member of the gold medal-winning Chinese team at the 41st Chess Olympiad in 2014 and at the World Team Chess Championship in 2015. In the 2014 Olympiad he also won the individual gold medal on board 3, thanks to his performance rating of 2912, the best of the entire event.

Tournaments

24 October–2 November 2003: World Youth Chess Championship (under-10) in Halkidiki, Greece. He scored 8½/11 coming equal second
November 3–14, 2004: World Youth Chess Championship (Under-10) in Heraklio, Crete, Greece. He scored 9/11 coming equal first with Jules Moussard, Raymond Song and Hou Yifan (the current Women's World Champion).
February 2007: Aeroflot Open Group C in Moscow. He scored 7.5/9 coming second
4–11 August 2007: Scandinavian Chess Tournament at Täby Park Hotel, Stockholm, Sweden. He scored 6½/9 coming 10th place
February 2008: Aeroflot Open Group B in Moscow. He scored 7.0/9 coming third
February 2009: Aeroflot Open Group A2 (and Blitz Tournament) in Moscow. He scored 5.5/9 coming 20th
12–24 May 2009: Asian Chess Championship in Subic, Philippines. He came 3rd place as he scored 6.0/9 with a performance rating of 2700. By doing so he qualified for his first 2009 World Cup in Khanty-Mansisk, Russia. This was his first GM norm
25–31 May 2009: 2nd Subic International Open in Subic Bay Free Port. He scored 6.0/9 (+3=6-0) with a 2653 performance finishing in 9th place This was his second GM norm
September 4, 2009: 6th Dato Arthur Tan Malaysia Open Chess Championship in Kuala Lumpur. He scored 6½/9
September 2009: Zhejiang Lishui Xingqiu Open, he came second behind Lê Quang Liêm with 6.5/9.
October 2009: World Junior Chess Championship in Puerto Madryn, Argentina. He scored 8.5/13 (+7=3-3) with a 2618 performance. He came 7th place on tiebreak
November 2009: Chess World Cup, Russia, reached the third round after achieving the biggest upset of the first round – winning 1,5:0,5 against 16th seed Sergei Movsesian, and also upsetting Mateusz Bartel in the second round.
February 2011: Aeroflot Open, Moscow, Russia. Tied for 4th–10th with Rustam Kasimdzhanov, Gata Kamsky, Rauf Mamedov, Ivan Cheparinov, Denis Khismatullin and Maxim Rodshtein.
May 2011: came first at Danzhou. He scored 7/9 (+5=4-0) with a performance rating of 2880.
September 2013: Overall winner of the 2013 World Junior Chess Championship. He came first with 11/13 (+9=4-0) with Alexander Ipatov close behind with 10.5/13 (+8=5-0). Due to winning the World Junior  Championship, he automatically qualifies for the Chess World Cup 2015 which is a qualification path to the World Chess Championship 2016.
March 2014: He competed in the Chinese Chess Championship and finished first on tiebreaks with 7/11 (+3=8-0) over his fellow countryman Ding Liren 7/11 (+4=6-1). He scored impressive wins over fellow players Liu Qingnan, Wei Yi and Zeng Chonsheng.
April 2014: He competed in the Asian Chess Championship and finished overall first 7/9 (+5=4-0) over Ni Hua, Rustam Kasimdzhanov and Adhiban B. With the win, he won $6,000 US. 
December 2014: Yu won the Qatar Masters scoring 7.5/9 (+6=3-0), beating former world champion Vladimir Kramnik and top seed Anish Giri.
June 2015: Yu won the 50th Capablanca Memorial in Havana, Cuba scoring 7/10 (+5=4-1), beating the top seed Leinier Domínguez twice for a 2860 performance rating.
December 2015: Yu earned second place in the 2nd edition of the Qatar Masters Open, scoring 7/9 (+5-0=4), defeating Wesley So in the final round but losing to Magnus Carlsen in the tiebreak.
August 14, 2019: Yu finished second place in the Saint Louis Rapid and Blitz event with a score of 21.5/36. The second place was tied and shared with Ding Liren and Maxime Vachier-Lagrave.
February–March 2022: Yu finished 20th in the FIDE Grand Prix 2022 with three points.

Personal Life
Yu Yangyi plays for Beijing chess club in the China Chess League (CCL).

Outside the chess world, Yu studied Sports Economics at Beijing Sports University.

References

External links 
 
 
 
 

1994 births
Living people
Chess grandmasters
World Junior Chess Champions
World Youth Chess Champions
People from Huangshi
Chess players from Hubei